Beecroft is a suburb in the Northern Sydney region of Sydney, in the state of New South Wales, Australia 22 kilometres north-west of the Sydney central business district in the local government areas of Hornsby Shire and City of Parramatta.

Beecroft resides the upper section of Lane Cove National Park, and is one of the oldest established suburbs in New South Wales. The suburb is notably affluent, and is characterised by leafy streets and large federation homes on big blocks of land.

History 

Beecroft was orchard country before its suburban development. The railway arrived in 1886 and Sir Henry Copeland, Minister of Lands, conducted a survey of the area to determine its suitability as a residential area. He named the suburb after the maiden name of his two wives, Hannah and Mary Beecroft, (two sisters he married in succession). Their names are also remembered through the respective naming of the suburb's east-west streets; Hannah Street, Copeland Road and Mary Street. Beecroft Post Office opened on 10 February 1890. Due to the strength of the temperance movement in Beecroft at that time there have never been any hotels in Beecroft. The bushland and amenity of Beecroft has been largely preserved due to the efforts of the Beecroft Cheltenham Civic Trust which has been very active since its inception in 1958.<ref>Beecroft and Cheltenham, The Shaping of a Sydney Community to 1914 (Beecroft Cheltenham History Group Inc, 1995). </ref>

Beecroft Cheltenham History Group

The BCHG was founded in 1987 by local history enthusiasts to record the history of Beecroft and Cheltenham and to collect and preserve photos and other historical information relative to the area. Since 2005 the BCHG has been part of the Beecroft Cheltenham Civic Trust. In 1995 a book covering the history of Beecroft and Cheltenham up to 1914 was published. In 2004 a book on walks around the district was published. In 2005 a book about the Beecroft Children’s Library was published.

 Commercial area 

The majority of commercial activity conducted in Beecroft is concentrated within a couple of blocks. Although not large by Sydney standards, it is nonetheless important in servicing the suburb and its immediate area, including neighbouring suburbs such as Cheltenham and Epping. The commercial area is located between Beecroft Road and Beecroft railway station. In keeping with the spirit of the traditional heritage, Old English is used throughout as the typeset of the Beecroft Village arcade. Hannah Street, the suburb's main commercial street, underwent a significant beautification upgrade in 2005.

As of 2016, a large portion of houses and commercial shops in the block have been knocked down to make room for new units and shops. Beecroft Place (at the corner of Hannah Street and Beecroft Road) was officially opened on 20 September 2017 with a Woolworths supermarket as its anchor tenant.

Beecroft shopping district was one of the first shopping districts in New South Wales to ban the use of plastic bags. This included Woolworths Beecroft to be the first Woolworths Supermarket to ban plastic bags in the state.

 Transport 

Beecroft railway station is on the Main Northern railway line. In addition to passenger railway traffic, the Main Northern Line also acts as an intercity and freight train thoroughfare passing through Beecroft. Beecroft is also serviced by various bus routes including route 553 operated by Busways and routes 651 and 635 operated by Hillsbus.

Prior to the construction of the M2 Hills Motorway, Beecroft's main road thoroughfare was commissioned as part of Sydney's Metroad system of major arterial roads and throughways. Beecroft Road was part of the Metroad 2 thoroughfare which took motorists between Sydney's Central Business District and Windsor via the Sydney Harbour Bridge, Epping and Castle Hill.

Churches
The Anglican Church was especially prominent in Beecroft society, but the suburb has three churches within its boundaries:

 St John's Anglican Church
 Beecroft Uniting Church
 Beecroft Presbyterian Church

 Education 
Beecroft has four Primary Schools, an independent Anglican school and a high school on the border of Carlingford:
 Beecroft Primary School - established in 1897. 
 Roselea Public School
 Epping Heights Public School
 St. Gerard Majella Catholic Primary School
 Arden Anglican School
 Carlingford High School

 Sport and recreation 

Beecroft has a number of recreational facilities within its boundaries. Beecroft is home to Pennant Hills Golf Club, a lawn bowls club now known as "The Beecroft Club" (previously "Beecroft Bowling and Recreation Club"), a lawn tennis club, as well as general park space at the Village Green, walking trails through Chilworth Reserve and other forested areas.

Population

Demographics

At the 2016 census of Population, there were 9,396 residents in Beecroft.
 Ethnic diversity  64.8% of people were born in Australia. The next most common countries of birth were China 7.2%, England 3.1%, Hong Kong 2.8%, India 2.3% and Sri Lanka 1.7%. 66.9% of people only spoke English at home. Other languages spoken at home included Mandarin 8.6%, Cantonese 6.5%, Korean 2.4%, Tamil 1.3% and Hindi 1.2%. 
 Religion  The most common responses for religious affiliation were No Religion 28.1%, Catholic 21.2% and Anglican 16.8%.
 Income  Beecroft has an average weekly household income of $2,598, above the national average of $1,486.
 Housing  The majority of dwellings (90%) were separate houses. The average people per household is 3.1.

Notable residents
 Dominic Perrottet, NSW Premier
 Sir Garfield Barwick, Chief Justice of the High Court
 Meredith Burgmann, politician
 Robin Morrow AM, academic and literary critic
 Ruth Cracknell AM, actress
 Steve Glasson, bowls player
 William Nixon, President of Hornsby Shire and architect
 Ellyse Perry, national women's cricket and soccer player
 Leslie Alfred Redgrave, writer, grazier and headmaster, lived from 1923 until 1943 at Bellingara'', 109 Copeland Road
 George Sargent, Australian meat pie businessman

References

External links
  [CC-By-SA]

Suburbs of Sydney
Hornsby Shire